Stable Companions is a 1922 British silent sports film directed by Albert Ward and starring Clive Brook, Lillian Hall-Davis and Robert English. It is set in the world of horse racing.

Cast
 Clive Brook as James Pilkington 
 Lillian Hall-Davis   
 Robert English as Sir Horace Pilkington 
 Arthur Pusey   
 Fred Mason  
 James Wigham
 Thomas Walters

References

Bibliography
 Low, Rachael. History of the British Film, 1918-1929. George Allen & Unwin, 1971.

External links

1922 films
1920s sports films
British horse racing films
British silent feature films
Films directed by Albert Ward
British black-and-white films
1920s English-language films
1920s British films
Silent sports films